"Just Friends" is a popular song that has become a jazz standard.   The song was written in 1931 by John Klenner with lyrics by Sam M. Lewis.  Although introduced by Red McKenzie and His Orchestra in October 1931, it first became a hit when singer Russ Columbo performed it with Leonard Joy’s Orchestra in 1932.  It charted again the same year in a version by Ben Selvin and His Orchestra and has been recorded often since.

Other recordings
 Red McKenzie – 1931
 Tommy Bond - 1933 in Mush and Milk
 Charlie Parker – 1949
 Sarah Vaughan – 1949
 Chet Baker – 1955
 Cecil Taylor with John Coltrane – Coltrane Time (1959)
 Lee Konitz with Bill Evans – Live at the Half Note (1959/1994)
 Grant Green - First Session (1960-1961)
 Sonny Rollins with Coleman Hawkins – Sonny Meets Hawk! (1963)
 Tony Bennett with Stan Getz and Herbie Hancock – Jazz (1964)
 Pat Martino – El Hombre (1967)
 Earl Hines – Fatha Plays Classics (1977)
 Joe Pass – I Remember Charlie Parker (1979)
 Dizzy Gillespie with Oscar Peterson, Freddie Hubbard, and Clark Terry – The Trumpet Summit Meets the Oscar Peterson Big 4 (1980)
 Sun Ra & His Arkestra - Just Friends (Saturn XI, 1983)
 Guitarist Larry Coryell – Toku Do (1988)
 Joe Williams – In Good Company (1989)
 Jack Sheldon - Jack Sheldon Sings (1993)
 Sarah Vowell, Spencer Fox, Craig T. Nelson, Holly Hunter]] and Chet Baker - (2006) The Incredibles
 Emmet Cohen and Patrick Bartley - (2021)

See also
List of 1930s jazz standards

References

"Just Friends" at jazzstandards.com

External links
Just Friends - detailed harmonic analysis of John Klenner's jazz classic

1931 songs
1930s jazz standards
Songs with lyrics by Sam M. Lewis
Songs written by John Klenner